Belisariidae is a family of scorpions belonging to the order Scorpiones.

Genera
There are two genera:
 Belisarius Simon, 1879
 Sardoscorpius Tropea & Onnis, 2020

References

Scorpions
Scorpion families
Taxa named by Wilson R. Lourenço